The Hits is a former UK music television channel.

The Hits may also refer to:

Radio stations
 Hits Radio, a popular mainstream UK music radio station
 The Hits (radio station), a New Zealand radio station

Albums
 The Hits 1969–1984, 1984 album by Sherbet
 The Hits (Ace of Base album), 2004
 The Hits (Alexia album), 2000
 The Hits (Amii Stewart album), 1985
 The Hits (April Wine album), 1987
 The Hits (Billy Joel album), 2010
 The Hits (Dr. Bombay album), 2007
 The Hits (Faith Hill album), 2007 
 The Hits (Garth Brooks album), 1994
 The Hits (Hal Ketchum album) 1996
 The Hits (Jagged Edge album), 2006
 The Hits (Kelis album), 2008
 The Hits (Lemar album), 2010
 The Hits (MC Breed album), 2007
 The Hits (MC Hammer album), 2000
 The Hits (REO Speedwagon album), 1988
 The Hits (Will Young album), 2009
 The Hits, song of Ladysmith Black Mambazo, 2006
 The Hits, song of Perfect Stranger, 2001
 The Hits/The B-Sides, a 1993 album by Prince
 The Hits Chapter 1 (Sammy Kershaw album) and The Hits Chapter 2, 1995 and 2001 albums by Sammy Kershaw
 The Hits: Chapter One, a 2001 album by The Backstreet Boys

See also
 The Hits Collection (disambiguation)
 The Hits, a compilation album series by Sony BMG and Warner Music
 The Hits & Beyond, a 2006 album by Dannii Minogue
 Greatest hits, a type of album